Hold Everything is an Australian television series which aired 1961 on Melbourne station HSV-7. A variety series, it was hosted by Peter Colville and aired at 9:30PM on Thursdays, facing tough competition from the popular In Melbourne Tonight on GTV-9. The series was produced at the Fitzroy Teletheatre.

After the series ended, some of the game show elements were retained in a new series titled Merry-Go-Round.

References

External links
Hold Everything on IMDb

1961 Australian television series debuts
1961 Australian television series endings
Black-and-white Australian television shows
English-language television shows
Australian variety television shows